Association for Standardization of Automation and Measuring Systems or ASAM is an incorporated association under German law. Its members are primarily international car manufacturers, suppliers and engineering service providers from the automotive industry. The association coordinates the development of technical standards, which are developed by working groups composed of experts from its member companies. ASAM pursues the vision that the tools of a development process chain can be freely interconnected and allow a seamless exchange of data. The standards define protocols, data models, file formats and application programming interfaces (APIs) for the use in the development and testing of automotive electronic control units. A large amount of popular tools in the areas of simulation, measurement, calibration and test automation are compliant to ASAM standards. Compliance shall guarantee interoperability of tools from different vendors, allow data exchange without the need for converters, and facilitate the exchange of unambiguous specification between customers and suppliers.

ASAM standards utilize other public standards such as UML, XML and CORBA, hence remaining independent from specific IT technologies or platforms. Furthermore, ASAM closely cooperates with other organizations such as ISO and AUTOSAR.

History
During the economic crisis at the end of the 1980s and beginning of the 1990s, the automotive industry was under high pressure to cut costs and to optimize their internal processes. One area identified for cost savings was the measurement and testing area for vehicle development. The equipment used there had been mostly purpose-built solutions, with widely incompatible interfaces and data formats, which severely impeded interconnectivity and exchange of data. The directors of development from Audi, BMW, Daimler-Benz, Porsche and Volkswagen agreed to cooperate in this area and founded in 1991 the "Arbeitskreis zur Standardisierung von Automatisierungs- und Messsystemen" (ASAM, Eng., working group for the standardization of automation and measuring systems). Unlike earlier standardization efforts, where standards were created by OEMs and unilaterally imposed on suppliers, ASAM had the goal right from the beginning to include suppliers in the standard development process as equal partners. This measure brought in their technological know-how and ensured that the standards are feasible and result in cost-effective products.

The first standards that came out of ASAM were ASAM ODS, ASAM-G (predecessors of today's ASAM GDI), ASAM ACS-I (predecessors of ASAM ACI) and the series of ASAM ASAP-1, -2 and -3 standards (predecessors of ASAM MCD-1, -2, -3).

In 1996, the EU-funded project STAUMECS further supported the development of standards. Since the number and importance of the standards grew steadily, ASAM e.V. was founded on Dec. 1st, 1998 in Stuttgart/Germany as the legal entity that owns and distributes the standards.

Chronology 
 1998: Founding of ASAM e.V. as a registered association by 26 founding members. First chairman came from DaimlerChrysler. First business manager was sent by BMW.
 1999: First release of ASAM ACI. First regional ASAM interest group in the USA.
 2000: First public release of ASAM MCD-2 D (ODX).
 2001: First ASAM Techday in the USA at DaimlerChrysler in Auburn Hills, MI.
 2002: First release of ASAM CEA.Incorporation of MSR standards into ASAM.
 2003: Number of members surpassed the one hundred mark and included companies from the USA, Japan, France and Sweden.  First release of ASAM MCD-3.
 2004: First cross-testing event organized by ASAM. ASAM ODS tool vendors carry out interoperability tests with their products. Event hosted by GM in Detroit.  BoD decision to freeze all standards at their current version for 18 month to help tool vendors to develop ASAM-compliant tools.  First release of ASAM MCD-2 NET (FIBEX).  ASAM ODS 5.0 has been accepted by ISO and published as ISO 22720.
 2005: Founding of ASAM LLC as the regional representation of ASAM in the USA.
 2006: First ASAM Solutions Guide published, containing case studies and a directory of ASAM members and products.  First release of ASAM CDF.  First release of ASAM MDX.  First release of ASAM MBFS.  First releases of official ASAM checkers: A2L Checker, ODS Model and Data Checker.
 2007: Regional representation of ASAM in India.  First release of ASAM FSX.
 2008: Founding of the TSC (Technical Steering Committee) for technical controlling of the standard development.  First release of ASAM LXF.
 2009: First release of ASAM HIL.  Incorporation of MDF into ASAM and first release as ASAM MDF. 
 2010: Membership meeting decision to allow free access to ASAM standards for members only. Non-members have to purchase standards to contribute to the costs of their development.
 2011: First regional project group in the USA for creating an ODS companion standard.  Honda becomes first OEM member from Japan.  First regional ASAM interest group in Japan.
 2012: ASAM MCD-3 is split up into two independent standards ASAM MCD-3 MC and ASAM MCD-3 D.  First release of ASAM ATX.
 2013: Renaming of ASAM HIL to ASAM XIL and release of ASAM XIL 2.0 with open-source software that implements a significant part of the standard's API.
 2014: First time release of open-source software together with standard (ASAM XIL 2.0.)
 2015: ASAM opens office in Japan to support Japanese members.  First release of ASAM OTX Extensions. The standard is proposed for transfer to ISO 13029 as part 4 of the standard.
 2016: First release of ASAM MCD-2 CERP and ASAM CPX
 2017: First release of ASAM MCD-1 POD

Members
ASAM has more than 200 member companies worldwide. They mostly originate from the automotive industry, although ASAM does not limit the membership to this industry. Major member companies are BMW, Bosch, Continental, Daimler, Denso, Delphi, GM, Honda, SAIC, Toyota, TRW, Volkswagen and Volvo.

The member companies can be broadly categorized into three major groups:
 End Users: OEMs and their suppliers, mostly applying tools and processes compliant to ASAM standards
 ASAM System Providers: tool vendors and service providers, implementing ASAM standards in tools or via engineering services
 Educational: universities and research institutions
Members pay an annual fee, which is dependent on the number of their employees. They gain free access to all ASAM standards and checker tools, and can use them for the development of tools or for providing engineering services. Furthermore, the membership allows to propose changes to existing standards or the development of new standards and to participate in their development.

Typically, large companies such as OEMs and Tier-1s have a strong interest in standards, as they are used to displace proprietary or home-grown systems and make them more independent from specific tool vendors or costly, internal tool departments. ASAM standards are an insurance for OEMs and Tier-1s that their investment in testing and development equipment is stable and can be reused for the long term.

ASAM System Providers have a significant advantage, too, as ASAM standards create a global and OEM-independent market for their products. The standards allow them to sell products to a wide group of End Users without having to implement major product customizations. This minimizes development costs and maximizes profits. Those companies, who actively participate in the development of the standards, have an additional "first-to-market" advantage.

The strength of ASAM is its large group of System Providers. Nearly two-thirds of the ASAM members belong to this group. As a consequence, ASAM-compliant tools and engineering services are widely available. According to an expert opinion, there are about 500 products worldwide available just in the area of MCD-systems.

Organizational structure

ASAM is set up as an incorporated association. The structure allows the integration of new members in the existing organization.

The highest decision-making body of ASAM is the annual Membership Meeting. Each company has voting rights in proportion to their annual membership fee. The delegates elect the Board of Directors and the Technical Steering Committee for alternating two year terms. They furthermore accept the annual financial report, approve changes of the statutes and vote on any further decisions of strategic importance.

The Board of Directors (BoD) has operational control of the association, but is bound to the decisions of the membership meeting. The BoD consist of up to five members. The Board represents ASAM on all legal and public matters, is responsible for the finances of the association, decides on the admission or expulsion of members, sets guidelines for the other committees and the head office, develops a long-term strategy for the association and monitors its execution.

The Technical Steering Committee (TSC) focuses mainly on technical and market aspects of ASAM standards. The committee consist of a maximum of 10 delegates from the ASAM community. The primary goal of the TSC is to ensure that the standard portfolio of ASAM meets market needs and stays competitive. The committee evaluates technical proposals, monitors the progress of ongoing projects, and reviews and releases new or revised standards.

The actual development work of standards is done by the ASAM Project Groups. Those groups may be closed, which means that only those companies send members to the Project Group, who proposed the standard. An open Project Group may also allow or invite further participants. Project Groups may work on the development of future versions of a standard (FVD Projects), or they carry out maintenance tasks on a standard such as minor revisions or bug fixing (Maintenance Projects).

ASAM has a head office near Munich/Germany, which takes care of the distribution of standards, maintains an IT infrastructure for the Project Groups, provides first-level expertise on its standards, carries out technical marketing and provides general membership services.

Standards Creation Process

Members of the association initiate the development of new standards, or the extension or correction of existing standards. The process is started via an "Issue Proposal" to ASAM, which describes the desired goals, use-cases, technical content, estimated resources and a project plan. The proposal is publicized to all members for feedback. After a minimum of 6 weeks of discussion, the proposal and member feedback is presented to the TSC for evaluation and decision. In case resources are secured and the proposal is accepted by the TSC, then the proposed project can be kicked off.

25% of a required budget of a project is usually borne by ASAM. The remaining 75% is covered by the participating companies of the project via work commitments, contributions of existing documents or funds. A project can only start, if at least three member companies participate in the project group.

ASAM provides the work infrastructure for the project team, i.e. an issue tracking system, a file repository and versioning control system, means for remote conferencing, process descriptions and guidelines, document templates and the support through the staff of its head office.

The project team elects a project leader, who is responsible for organizational matters, ensuring the progress of the group's work and keeping it on track in accordance with the approved project proposal. The ASAM office assigns a maintenance project manager for maintenance projects, who controls and carries out the operative work for the project group. Otherwise, the project team sets up its inner structure and working processes according to its own needs.

Throughout the project term, the project members work on the standard through regular meetings, phone conferences or individual off-line work. The project leader regularly reports the progress of the group's work to the TSC.

Once the project team members determine that the standard is ready for release, they submit the deliverables for review to the TSC. Deliverables may include documents, schemas, reference code and example files. The project leader presents the release at the TSC meeting. The TSC and the BoD of ASAM approve the release. The ASAM office publicizes the release and makes the standard available for download for its members.

Portfolio of Standards
ASAM standards are primarily used in the automotive industry. They focus on the definition of communication interfaces between devices in the measurement, calibration, diagnostics and testing area. The standards cover processes and tool-chains in these areas and have the goal to reduce the development, integration and maintenance efforts for them. ASAM standards cover specific use-cases and are developed according to the following guiding principles:
 Independence from Hardware and Operating System
 Use of object-oriented models
 Definition of semantics and syntax
 Independence from the physical storage of data

Consequently, they are vendor- and technology-independent, which keeps system components of different origin interchangeable and decouples them from the continuous advances of IT platforms. This secures investments in tools and processes for the long-term.

ASAM uses common description methods for the technology definitions in the standards:
 Format description: defines syntax and semantics of a file format for the purpose of data exchange.
 API: defines the interface and functional behavior of executable routines for the purpose of calling service routines or exchanging data between computer programs.
 Protocol definition: defines syntax, semantics and synchronization of the communication via a bus for the purpose of establishing a communication link between computer systems.
 Technology reference: specifies a technology-dependent interpretation of the technology-independent parts of the standard, typically via mapping rules or program code.
 Application area companion: defines an extension of a base standard for a specific application area or a specific type of device.
 Transport layer specification: defines how a generic protocol definition is to be interpreted using a concrete physical layer.

ASAM has subdivided the standards into three groups, which are briefly described in the following tables:
 AE: Automotive Electronics
 CAT: Computer Aided Testing
 COMMON: Common standards shared between AE and CAT

ASAM AE
ASAM AE standards (Automotive Electronics) are primarily applied during the design and implementation phases of ECU software development (left side of the V-Model). They focus on:
 design of functional and interface specifications for software components
 carrying out measurement, calibration and diagnostics tasks on an ECU
 automation of HIL tests
 description of engineering artifacts
 exchange of engineering issues

ASAM CAT
ASAM CAT standards (Computer Aided Testing) are primarily applied during the verification & validation phases of ECU software development (right side of the V-Model), and during automated calibration and system testing on engine and vehicle test beds. They focus on:
 automated calibration
 storage of testing data
 evaluation and analysis of testing data

ASAM COMMON (Common)
ASAM COMMON standards are used in both areas, AE and CAT.

Further reading
 R. Bartz. Grundlagen und Einsatz von ASAM-Standards. 2001. Expert-Verlag. 
 C. Marscholik, P. Subke. Road vehicles - Diagnostic communication - Technology & Applications. 2008. Hüthig Verlag. .
 W. Zimmermann, R. Schmidgall. Bussysteme in der Fahrzeugtechnik. 2010. Vieweg + Teubner Verlag. 
 C. Marscholik, P. Subke. Datenkommunikation im Automobil. 2011. VDI Verlag.

References

External links 
 

Professional associations based in Germany
Automotive standards